The Gallery of Fashion was a British fashion magazine, published between 1794 and 1803.   It was the first British fashion magazine, being the first publication in Britain devoted exclusively to fashion.

The magazine was published in London by Nicholas Heideloff.  It was produced following the model of the first fashion magazine in Europe, the Cabinet des Modes, which had been both exported as well as copied in the rest of Europe but discontinued during the French revolution.

Gallery

References

1794 establishments in Great Britain
1803 disestablishments in the United Kingdom
Defunct magazines published in the United Kingdom
Women's magazines published in the United Kingdom
English-language magazines
Magazines established in 1794
Magazines disestablished in 1803
Magazines published in London
Women's fashion magazines